Thyou is a town in the Thyou Department of Boulkiemdé Province in central western Burkina Faso. It is the capital of the Thyou Department and has a population of 8,983.

References

External links
Satellite map at Maplandia.com

Populated places in Boulkiemdé Province